Helen Merrill (born Jelena Ana Milcetic; July 21, 1929) is an American jazz vocalist. Her first album, the eponymous 1954 recording Helen Merrill (with Clifford Brown), was an immediate success and associated her with the first generation of bebop jazz musicians. After an active 1950s and 1960s, Merrill spent time recording and touring in Europe and Japan, falling into obscurity in the United States. In the 1980s and '90s, she was under contract with Verve and her performances in America revived her profile. Known for her emotional, sensual vocal performances, her career continues in its sixth decade with concerts and recordings.

Early life and career
Jelena Ana Milcetic was born in New York to Croatian immigrant parents. She began singing in jazz clubs in the Bronx in 1944 when she was fourteen. By the time she was sixteen, Merrill had taken up music full-time. In 1952, Merrill made her recording debut when she was asked to sing "A Cigarette For Company" with Earl Hines; the song was released on the D'Oro label, created specifically to record Hines' band with Merrill. Etta Jones was in Hines' band at the time and she too sang on this session, which was reissued on the Xanadu label in 1985. At this time, Merrill was married to musician Aaron Sachs. They divorced in 1956.

Merrill was signed by Mercury Records to their EmArcy label. In 1954, Merrill recorded an eponymous LP; her first issued album featured trumpeter Clifford Brown and bassist Oscar Pettiford. The album was produced and arranged by Quincy Jones, who was twenty-one years old. The success of Helen Merrill prompted Mercury to sign her for an additional four-album contract.

Merrill's follow-up' was the 1956 LP, Dream of You, which was arranged by arranger and pianist Gil Evans. His arrangements for Merrill laid the foundation for his work with Miles Davis.

Abroad
After recording sporadically through the late 1950s and 1960s, Merrill spent much of her time touring Europe, where she enjoyed more commercial success than she had in the United States. She settled for a time in Italy, recording an album there and doing concerts with jazz musicians Piero Umiliani, Chet Baker, Romano Mussolini, and Stan Getz. In 1960, arranger and film composer Ennio Morricone worked with Merrill on an EP, Helen Merrill Sings Italian Songs, on the RCA Italiana label.

Parole e Musica: Words and Music was recorded in Italy with Umiliani's orchestra in the early 1960s while Merrill was living there. The LP features the unusual additions preceding each song, of spoken translations of eloquent Italian word lyrics, complementing the ballads and torch songs.

She returned to the U.S. in the 1960s, but moved to Japan in 1966, staying after touring there and marrying Donald J. Brydon (Tokyo-based Asia Bureau Chief of United Press International) in April 1967. She developed a following in Japan that remains strong decades later. In addition to recording while in Japan, Merrill became involved in other aspects of the music industry, producing albums for Trio Records and co-hosting a show on FEN (Armed Forces Radio and Television Service) with Bud Widom in Tokyo.

Later career
Merrill returned to the U.S. in 1972. She recorded a bossa nova album, a Christmas album, and a Rodgers and Hammerstein album. In 1987, she and Gil Evans recorded fresh arrangements of Dream of You released under the title Collaboration, becoming the best received of Merrill's 1980s albums.

In 1987, she co-produced Billy Eckstine Sings with Benny Carter. In 1995, she recorded Brownie: Homage to Clifford Brown. Jelena Ana Milcetic a.k.a. Helen Merrill (2000) draws from her Croatian heritage as well as her American upbringing. The album combines jazz, pop, and blues songs with traditional Croatian songs sung in Croatian. She released the album Lilac Wine in 2003.

Personal life
Merrill has been married three times, first to musician Aaron Sachs (1948–1956), second to UPI vice president Donald J. Brydon (1967–1992), and third to arranger-conductor Torrie Zito until his death in 2009.

She is the mother of one child, her son who was born in New York in 1951 (she is grandmother to his three children) from her first marriage to Allan Preston Sachs, later known professionally as Alan Merrill, who was a successful singer and songwriter who wrote and recorded the original (1975) version of the rock classic "I Love Rock N Roll" as lead vocalist of the British band Arrows, he died in 2020.

Discography

As leader/co-leader 
 Helen Merrill (EmArcy, 1955) – recorded in 1954
 Helen Merrill with Strings (EmArcy, 1955)
 Dream of You (EmArcy, 1957) – recorded in 1956–57
 Merrill at Midnight (EmArcy, 1957)
 The Nearness of You (EmArcy, 1958) – recorded in 1957–58
 You've Got a Date with the Blues (MetroJazz, 1959) – recorded in 1958
 American Country Songs (Atco, 1959)
 Helen Merrill Sings Italian Songs (RCA Italiana, 1960)
 The Artistry of Helen Merrill (Mainstream, 1965) – recorded in 1964
 The Feeling Is Mutual with Dick Katz (Milestone, 1967)
 A Shade of Difference with Dick Katz (Milestone, 1968)
 Helen Sings, Teddy Swings! with Teddy Wilson (Catalyst, 1970)
 Sposin with Gary Peacock Trio (Victor (Japan)/Storyville, 1971)
 John Lewis/Helen Merrill (Mercury, 1977)
 Autumn Love (Catalyst, 1977)
 Something Special (Inner City, 1978)
 Chasin' the Bird (Inner City, 1980)
 Casa Forte (Trio, 1980)
 Rodgers & Hammerstein Album (DRG, 1982)
 The Complete Helen Merrill on Mercury (Mercury, 1985)
 No Tears, No Goodbyes with Gordon Beck (Owl, 1985)
 Music Makers (Owl, 1986)
 Jerome Kern Album (Victor, 1986) – a.k.a. Sings Jerome Kern
 Collaboration with Gil Evans (EmArcy, 1988) – recorded in 1987
 Duets with Ron Carter (EmArcy, 1989)
 Just Friends (EmArcy, 1989)
 Christmas Song Book (JVC, 1991)
 Clear Out of This World (Antilles, 1992) – recorded in 1991
 Brownie: Homage to Clifford Brown (Verve, 1994)
 You and the Night and the Music (Verve, 1997)
 Jelena Ana Milcetic a.k.a. Helen Merrill (Gitanes, 2000) – recorded in 1999
 Lilac Wine (Sunnyside, 2003)
 Helen Merrill Sings the Beatles (Victor (Japan), 2003) – recorded in 1970

As guest 
With Billy Eckstine and Benny Carter
 Billy Eckstine Sings with Benny Carter (Verve, 1986)

References

Bibliography

External links

1930 births
Living people
American jazz singers
American people of Croatian descent
American women jazz singers
Milestone Records artists
Antilles Records artists
EmArcy Records artists
Verve Records artists
Mercury Records artists
Inner City Records artists
Singers from New York City
Jazz musicians from New York (state)
21st-century American women